The 2010 Cronulla-Sutherland Sharks season was the 44th in the club's history. They competed in the NRL's 2010 Telstra Premiership, finishing the regular season 14th (out of 16).

Ladder

Results

Trials

Regular season

Club Awards 
Club Person of the Year – Mark Noakes
Community Award – Reece Williams
NSW Cup Player of the Year – Trent Grubb
NSW Cup Player's Player – Matt Parata
Player of the Year – Paul Gallen
Player's Player – Paul Gallen
Rookie of the Year – Nathan Gardner
Toyota Cup Player of the Year – Dane Snelson
Toyota Cup Player's Player – Duncan Reilly

References

Cronulla-Sutherland Sharks seasons
Cronulla-Sutherland Sharks season